What Happened at St James is a 2021 Nigerian movie produced by Tosin Akintokun and directed by Marc Adebesin. The movie stars Zack Orji, Femi Branch, Ken Erics, Deyemi Okanlawon and the late  Rachel Oniga.

Synopsis 
Three young men were trapped in the consequences of their deeds in secondary school. Their various ways of solving the problems created suspense throughout the film

Premiere 
The movie was released in November 19 and was premiered nationwide.

Cast 
Zack Orji, Femi Branch, Ken Erics, Deyemi Okanlawon, Rachel Oniga, Yemi Sodimu, Kelechi Udegbe, Nelly Ejianwu, Bolaji Ogunmola, Chimezie Imo, Damilare Lawal and Kayode Obayomi

References 

2021 films
Nigerian drama films
English-language Nigerian films
2021 drama films